Do You Believe in Magic may refer to:

Do You Believe in Magic, a 1990 children's book by Saviour Pirotta
Do You Believe in Magic? (book), a 2013 book by Paul Offit about alternative medicine
 Do You Believe in Magic (film), a 2008 documentary film
 Do You Believe in Magic (album), an album by The Lovin' Spoonful
Do You Believe in Magic?, 1980 album by Japanese singer Susan
 "Do You Believe in Magic" (song), by The Lovin' Spoonful 1965, covered by several artists
 "Do You Believe in Magic" (Modern Family), a 2017 television episode
 "Do You Believe In Magic" (episode), a 1990 live-action The Super Mario Bros. Super Show! episode

See also
Do You Believe (disambiguation)